Johns Run is a  long 1st order tributary to Sweden Fork in Pittsylvania County, Virginia.

Course 
Johns Run rises in a pond about 1 mile north of Spring Garden, Virginia in Pittsylvania County and then flows generally south to join Sweden Fork about 1 mile northeast of Dodson Corners.

Watershed 
Johns Run drains  of area, receives about 45.6 in/year of precipitation, has a wetness index of 393.97, and is about 41% forested.

See also 
 List of Virginia Rivers

References 

Rivers of Pittsylvania County, Virginia
Rivers of Virginia